The Fujifilm X-T4 is a mirrorless interchangeable-lens digital camera announced on February 25, 2020. It has a backside-illuminated X-Trans CMOS 4 APS-C sensor and an X-Processor 4 quad core processor and uses the Fujifilm X-mount. The X-T4 is a weather-resistant camera equipped with a higher-capacity battery designed to last longer than the X-T3. It is the successor to 2018's X-T3, which is a little smaller and lighter.

The X-T4 is capable of recording video in 4K resolution up to 60 fps with a maximum bitrate of 400Mbit/s. The camera, styled after an SLR, is available in 2 colors, black and silver.

Comparison with previous Fujifilm XT cameras
Compared to its predecessor, the X-T4 has better autofocus capability. Fujifilm says its subject tracking system is faster now that it considers color and shape as well as distance information. It can also shoot 240fps videos at 1080p. The X-T4 is built around a new shutter mechanism, which is one of the changes that allows it to shoot at 15 frames per second. The new mechanism features improved damping and is rated to last 300,000 cycles: twice the rating given to the X-T2 shutter.

Key features

The X-T4 is a mirrorless compact camera made by Fujifilm. It measures 134.6 mm x 92.8 mm x 63.8 mm and weighs 607 g including memory card and battery.

Mechanical dials are provided for key operations, including shutter speed, ISO sensitivity, exposure compensation, drive modes and metering modes. It lacks built-in flash, and does not include a flash unit.

 26.1 megapixels X-Trans CMOS 4 sensor.
 In-body image stabilization, capable of up to 6.5 stops
 New shutter mechanism with 300,000 actuations
 Weather resistant structure
 Dedicated movie and HDR modes in the dial 
 Autofocus joystick
 A new filter, the Eterna Bleach Bypass film simulation
 NP-W235 battery, a higher-capacity battery than with the X-T3, that lasts approximately 500 frames per charge
 X-Processor 4, a quad-core CPU.
 23.5 mm x 15.6 mm CMOS sensor (APS-C) Fujifilm X-Trans sensor.
 Fully articulated Touch Screen
 Selectable film simulations
 60 fps shooting in 4K
 Hybrid autofocus
 New Phase detection AF to entire frame
 Up to 30 fps black-out free high-speed continuous shooting
 4K video up to 60fps 10 bit recording
 4K Burst, 4K Multi Focus
 Headphone and Microphone sockets
 USB-C which can be used for charging battery
 Wi-Fi and Bluetooth connectivity for connection and tagging via a smartphone
 UHS-II SD card dual slot with a removable SD card door
 New vertical grip, housing two additional batteries.
 Available in silver and black in a magnesium alloy body

References

External links

X-T4
Cameras introduced in 2020